Thomas Ringland Stockdale (March 28, 1828 – January 8, 1899) was a U.S. Representative from Mississippi.

Biography
Born at West Union Church near Waynesburg, Pennsylvania, Stockdale graduated from Jefferson College (now Washington & Jefferson College) in 1856 and received a master's degree in 1859. He taught school in Pike County, Mississippi, received his law degree from the University of Mississippi in 1859 and practiced in Woodville, Mississippi.

During the Civil War, he served in the Confederate States Army. Enlisting as a private in the 16th Mississippi Infantry in 1861, he was promoted to lieutenant, captain and major, and served as regimental adjutant. He later commanded a battalion in the 4th Mississippi Cavalry Regiment and then served as the regiment's second in command with the rank of lieutenant colonel.

After the war Stockdale resumed the practice of law in Summit, Mississippi.  He served as a delegate to the Democratic National Convention in 1868. He was also a Democratic presidential elector in 1872 and 1884.

Stockdale was elected to the United States House of Representatives as a Democrat in 1886 and served four terms, March 4, 1887 to March 3, 1895. He was an unsuccessful candidate for renomination in 1894.

In 1896 Stockdale was appointed to fill a vacancy as a justice of the Mississippi Supreme Court and he served until 1897.

He died in Summit, Mississippi on January 8, 1899, and was interred in Summit's Woodlawn Cemetery.

Stockdale's home has been preserved by the Summit Historical Society, and the grounds of his home also contain a memorial to Stockdale.

References

External links

1828 births
1899 deaths
People from Greene County, Pennsylvania
People from Summit, Mississippi
Washington & Jefferson College alumni
University of Mississippi alumni
People of Mississippi in the American Civil War
Confederate States Army officers
Northern-born Confederates
Mississippi lawyers
Justices of the Mississippi Supreme Court
Democratic Party members of the United States House of Representatives from Mississippi
19th-century American politicians
19th-century American judges
19th-century American lawyers
Military personnel from Pennsylvania